is a city located in Iwate Prefecture, in the Tōhoku region of northern Japan. , the city had a population of 114,476 and a population density of 91 persons per km² in 46,375 households. It is currently the second largest city by population in the prefecture, after Morioka.

Geography
Ichinoseki is located inland in the south of Iwate Prefecture, a little over two hours north of Tokyo by the Tōhoku Shinkansen. A large volume of extremely stable granite rock runs beneath the city, and is the center of the site is being promoted as a suitable location for construction of the International Linear Collider (ILC).

Neighboring municipalities
Iwate Prefecture
Ōshū
Rikuzentakata
Sumita
Hiraizumi
Miyagi Prefecture
Kesennuma
Kurihara
Tome
Akita Prefecture
Higashinaruse

Climate
Ichinoseki has a humid climate (Köppen climate classification Cfa) with warm summers and cold winters. The average annual temperature in Ichinoseki is 10.9 °C. The average annual rainfall is 1248 mm with September as the wettest month and January as the driest month. The temperatures are highest on average in August, at around 24.3 °C, and lowest in January, at around -1.5 °C.

Demographics
The agricultural makeup of the city outside the centre is mostly composed of farmers, leading to an influx of Chinese and Filipino immigrants due to marriage. As a result, Ichinoseki has a varied ethnic makeup, although the newcomers still remain a small minority.

Per Japanese census data, the population of Ichinoseki peaked in the 1950s and has declined over the past 70 years. Ichinoseki has been recognized by Japan's Office for the Promotion of Regional Revitalization (Kishida Cabinet Secretariat), which promotes the development of new technologies to combat depopulation, for meeting a "high standard" of digital transformation/telework infrastructure. Related projects have been awarded over ¥80M in government grants.

History
The area of present-day Ichinoseki was part of ancient Mutsu Province, and has been settled since at least the Japanese Paleolithic period. The area was inhabited by the Emishi people, and came under the control of the Yamato dynasty during the early Heian period. During the Heian period, it was controlled by the Abe clan, followed by the Northern Fujiwara clan of Hiraizumi. During the Sengoku period, the area was dominated by various samurai clans before coming under the control of the Date clan during the Edo period, who ruled Sendai Domain under the Tokugawa shogunate. A portion of the present city was part of Ichinoseki Domain, a sub-domain of Sendai Domain.

The town of Ichinoseki was established within Nishiiwai District, Iwate on April 1, 1889 with the establishment of the modern municipality system. It was raised to city status on April 1, 1948 by the merger of the towns of Ichinoseki and Yamame with the villages of Mataki and Nakasato.

January 1, 1955 -  Ichinoseki absorbed the villages of Genbi, Hagisho, Maikawa, and Yasakae 
September 1, 1956 - Due to a boundary adjustment, the city absorbed parts of the town of Hiraizumi.
May 1, 1964 - Due to a boundary adjustment, the city absorbed more of the town of Hiraizumi.
September 20, 2005 - the towns of Daitō, Higashiyama and Senmaya, the villages of Kawasaki and Murone (all from Higashiiwai District), and the town of Hanaizumi (from Nishiiwai District) were merged with the city of Ichinoseki, which approximately doubled the old city's population and nearly tripled its size.
September 26, 2011 - the town of Fujisawa (also from Higashiiwai District) was merged into Ichinoseki. Higashiiwai District was dissolved as a result of this merger.

Government
Ichinoseki has a mayor-council form of government with a directly elected mayor and a unicameral city council of 25 members. Ichinoseki and the town of Hiraizumi collectively contribute five seats to the Iwate Prefectural legislature. In terms of national politics, the city is part of Iwate 3rd district of the lower house of the Diet of Japan.

Education
Ichinoseki has 29 public elementary schools and 16 public junior high schools operated by the city government and one junior high school and eight public elementary schools operated by the Iwate Prefectural Board of Education. There is also one private high school and one private junior college. The Prefecture also operates one special education school for the handicapped.

Special school
 岩手県立一関清明支援学校

Elementary schools

Junior high schools

High schools
Ichinoseki Gakuin High School (一関学院高等学校)
Ichinoseki Shuko High School (一関修紅高等学校) (also has a preschool and a university)
Ichinoseki No. 1 High School (岩手県立一関第一高等学校)
Ichinoseki No. 2 High School (岩手県立一関第二高等学校)
Hanaizumi High School (岩手県立花泉高等学校)
Daito High School (岩手県立大東高等学校)
Senmaya High School (岩手県立千厩高等学校)
Ichinoseki Tech High School (岩手県立一関工業高等学校)

Kosen
 Ichinoseki National College of Technology (一関工業高等専門学校)

Junior college
 Shuko Junior College

Transportation

Railway
 East Japan Railway Company (JR East) - Tōhoku Shinkansen 

 East Japan Railway Company (JR East) - Tōhoku Main Line 
 -  -  -  -  - 
 East Japan Railway Company (JR East) - Ōfunato Line 
 -  -  - -  -  -  - Surisawa -  -  -  -  -

Highway

Local attractions

Ichinoseki is in close proximity to the historically significant site of Hiraizumi, which lies adjacent to the mid-northern border of the city. Ichinoseki station is a convenient transit hub for excursions to Hiraizumi, with access to Tōhoku Shinkansen and local rail lines.
Geibikei is a dramatic river gorge which offers rides in traditional flat-bottomed boats, navigated by singing "gondoliers".
Genbikei is another popular river area with naturally carved cliffs.
Honederamura Shōen ruins has been designated an Important Cultural Landscape and a National Historic Site. A brochure can be seen here. http://www.ichitabi.jp/guidebook/pdf/guidebook_04_03_en.pdf

Sister Cities/Friendship Cities

International relations
 - Central Highlands Regional Council, Queensland, Australia.

Friendship Cities
Miharu (Tamura District, Fukushima Prefecture)
Signed between the former city of Ichinoseki on August 8, 1987
Kesennuma (Miyagi Prefecture)
Signed between the former cities of Ichinoseki and Kesennuma on May 1, 1997
Signed between the former city of Kesennuma and former town of Murone on May 8, 2003
Tanabe (Wakayama Prefecture)
Signed between the former village of Murone and the town of Hongu on August 8, 1987
Yoshikawa (Saitama Prefecture)
Signed by the former village of Murone on April 15, 1997

Noted people from Ichinoseki
Ayaka Komatsu, model/actress
Keiko Fuji, singer/actress 
Shota Kimura, baseball player
Miyagiyama Fukumatsu, sumo wrestler
Masato Onodera, professional wrestler
Shota Onodera, basketball player
Takahira Kogorō, diplomat
Yuumi Shida, model/actress

References

External links

  
 Ichinoseki tourist information

 
Cities in Iwate Prefecture